Klaus Katzur (26 August 1943 – 4 September 2016) was a German swimmer who competed in the 1964, 1968, and 1972 Summer Olympics. In 1972, he won a silver medal in the 4 × 100 metre medley relay and finished eighth in the 200 metre breaststroke. Two years earlier, he won two gold medals in these events at the 1970 European Aquatics Championships. Between 1963 and 1972, he won 13 national titles in breaststroke, freestyle, and medley events.

References

1943 births
2016 deaths
Sportspeople from Potsdam
People from the Province of Brandenburg
German male swimmers
German male breaststroke swimmers
Olympic swimmers of the United Team of Germany
Olympic swimmers of East Germany
Swimmers at the 1964 Summer Olympics
Swimmers at the 1968 Summer Olympics
Swimmers at the 1972 Summer Olympics
Olympic silver medalists for East Germany
European Aquatics Championships medalists in swimming
Medalists at the 1972 Summer Olympics
Olympic silver medalists in swimming
Recipients of the Patriotic Order of Merit in silver
20th-century German people
21st-century German people